Papilionanthe pedunculata is a species of epiphytic orchid native to Cambodia, and Vietnam. This species is a floristic component of the South Annamese endemism center, which is characterised by isolated, uplifted plateaux and high mountain systems. They are also found in dry lowland Dipterocarp forests in southern Vietnam. The plant has obvious xeromorphic features and is adapted to these dry conditions. The cool-growing plant occurs at 1200 to 1300 m. The plants are large and terete.

Conservation
This species is included in the CITES appendix II and international trade is regulated to protect wild populations.

References

pedunculata
Orchids of Vietnam
Orchids of Cambodia